The 1997 Zurich Open was a women's tennis tournament played on indoor hard courts at the Hallenstadion in Zürich in Switzerland. It was part of Tier I of the 1997 WTA Tour. It was the 14th edition of the tournament and was held from October 12 through October 19, 1997.

Champions

Singles

 Lindsay Davenport defeated  Nathalie Tauziat 7–6, 7–5
 It was Davenport's 11th title of the year and the 29th of her career.

Doubles

 Martina Hingis /  Arantxa Sánchez Vicario defeated  Larisa Savchenko /  Helena Suková 4–6, 6–4, 6–1
 It was Hingis' 19th title of the year and the 25th of her career. It was Sánchez Vicario's 6th title of the year and the 79th of her career.

European Indoors
Zurich Open